Protase Rugambwa (born 31 May 1960) is a Tanzanian prelate of the Catholic Church who has been the secretary of the Congregation for the Evangelization of Peoples since his appointment 9 November 2017. He previously served as that congregation's adjunct secretary and president of the Pontifical Mission Societies since his appointment on 26 June 2012.

Biography
Rugambwa was born in 1960 at Bunena, in the diocese of Bukoba. He had an elder brother, Paulo Kishumba (1957-2021). After his primary and secondary schools in various seminaries and Minor Katoke Itaga, Rugambwa studied philosophy at Kibosho Senior Seminary and theology at St. Charles Lwanga Segerea Senior Seminary.

He was ordained priest on 2 September 1990 in Dar-es-Salaam by John Paul II during his pastoral visit to Tanzania, and incardiated the diocese of Rulenge.

After ordination he had the following activities: 
1990-1991: Parish Vicar in the parish of Mabira
 1991-1994: Teacher in the Minor Seminary of Katoke, in charge of the Liturgy and Diocesan Chaplain of the hospital Biharamulo
 1994-1998: Studies for a doctorate in pastoral theology at the Pontifical Lateran University in Rome (promotion)
 1998-1999: Trainer of the spiritual year's seminarians, Director of Vocations in the Diocese of Rulenge, Executive Secretary of the Department of Pastoral Care
 2000-2002: Vicar General of the diocese of Rulenge and Moderator of Personnel
 2002-2008: Official of the Congregation for the Evangelization of Peoples.

On 18 January 2008, Pope Benedict XVI appointed Rugambwa Bishop of the Diocese of Kigoma, Tanzania. He received his episcopal consecration on 13 April.

On 26 June 2012, Benedict appointed him adjunct secretary of the Congregation for the Evangelization of Peoples and concurrently president of the Pontifical Mission Societies, replacing Archbishop Piergiuseppe Vacchelli, who had reached the retirement age. He was at the same time appointed Archbishop ad personam.

On 9 November 2017 Pope Francis promoted him to secretary of the Congregation.

Publication
Protase Rugambwa: Ministry and collaboration in small Christian communities: ″Communities in Rulenge Diocese-Tanzania, a case study″. Theological dissertation, Pontificia Università Lateranense, Rome, 1998.

References

External links
 ′Archbishop Protase Rugambwa′ in Catholic-hierarchy.org

Living people
1960 births
Pontifical Lateran University alumni
21st-century Roman Catholic bishops in Tanzania
Members of the Congregation for the Evangelization of Peoples
Roman Catholic bishops of Kigoma